Eddie Wilson may refer to:

 Eddie Wilson (baseball) (1909–1979), Major League Baseball outfielder in the 1930s
 Eddie Wilson (American football) (born 1940), American Football League quarterback in the 1960s
 Eddie Wilson (sportsman), cricketer and badminton player
 Eddie Wilson, the title character in the Eddie and the Cruisers films
 Edwin Osbourne Wilson, founder of Armadillo World Headquarters

See also
Eddy Wilson, after whom the E. E. Wilson Wildlife Area was named
Edwin Wilson (disambiguation)
Edward Wilson (disambiguation)